International Automobile Construction Company was a veteran era American automobile company.

History 
Founded in Portland, Maine, in early 1900 with a capitalization of US$100,000, International's officers were R. M. Gray, W. H. Ricker, C. E. Fay and H. L. Cram.

Like many early American automobile companies, it is doubtful International actually built any cars.

Sources
Kimes, Beverly Rae. The Standard Catalog of American Cars, 1805-1942. Iola, Wisconsin: Krause Publications, 1989. .
Veteran vehicles
1900s cars
Defunct motor vehicle manufacturers of the United States
Vehicle manufacturing companies established in 1900
History of Maine
Economy of Portland, Maine
Defunct manufacturing companies based in Maine